= Selama Mint Cheikhne Ould Lemrabott =

Mauritanian politician

Selama Mint Cheikhne Ould Lemrabott (born 1973) is a minister in the government of Mauritania.
